Pedro Brescia Cafferata (1921–2014) was a Peruvian businessman. He was the co-chairman of Grupo Breca, a conglomerate founded by his father, and the president of BBVA Continental, a Peruvian bank.

Early life
Pedro Brescia Cafferata was born in 1921. His father, Fortunato Brescia Tassano, was the Italian-born founder of Grupo Breca, a real estate company-turned-conglomerate. His mother, María Catalina Cafferata Peñaranda, was Peruvian. He had a brother and two sisters, all billionaires.

Career
Brescia Cafferata managed Grupo Breca with his brother Mario. He was also the chairman of the insurance company Rímac Seguros, the bank BBVA Continental, and the fish company Tasa.

Death
Brescia Cafferata died in 2014 at the age of 93.

References

1921 births
2014 deaths
Brescia family
National Agrarian University alumni
Peruvian people of Italian descent
20th-century Peruvian businesspeople
Peruvian bankers